This is a list of street railways in Canada by province. Prince Edward Island, Northwest Territories and Nunavut are the only places in Canada to not have had any tram (streetcar) system. The list includes all streetcar systems, past and present.

Alberta

British Columbia

Manitoba

New Brunswick

Newfoundland and Labrador

Nova Scotia

Ontario

Quebec

Saskatchewan

Yukon

See also

 List of town tramway systems in North America
 List of light-rail transit systems
 List of rapid transit systems
 List of trolleybus systems in Canada
 History of rail transport in Canada
 Urban rail transit in Canada

References

Books and periodicals listed at foot of List of town tramway systems

Canada
Tram